Bolo, also known as Ngoya and Kibala, is a Bantu language of Angola that is closely related to Kimbundu.

Name
The only name for the language as a whole, 'Ngoya', was originally pejorative, though it is becoming increasingly accepted. 'Kibala' is the Umbundu name for the central dialect, Ipala. 'Bolo' is a peripheral dialect.

Varieties
The dialects of this language are Ipala, Hebó, Ucela, Mbwĩ, Bolo and Sende.

References

Languages of Angola
Kimbundu languages